BodyShaping is an American fitness and exercise television series that has shown on ESPN, with segments on weight training, cardiovascular exercise, stretching and nutrition. It was in production from 1988 to 1998, and has been in reruns ever since.

The list of cast members has included personalities such as Deprise Brescia, Cory Everson, Kiana Tom, Carla Dunlap, Keelin Curnuck, Jennifer Dempster, Page Langton, Rick Valente, Kendell Hogan, Mary Jean Traetta, and Laurie Donnelly and cameo appearances by supermodel Kathy Ireland.

The program was produced by High Bar Productions, which also produced other ESPN2 exercise programs such as Co-ed Training and Fitness Beach.

References

External links

American non-fiction television series
ESPN original programming
1990 American television series debuts
1998 American television series endings